Shanghai cuisine (Shanghainese: zaon⁶ he⁵ tshe¹; IPA: [zɑ̃¹¹ he⁴⁴ tsʰᴇ¹¹]), also known as Hu cuisine (Shanghainese: wu⁶ tshe¹; IPA: [ɦu¹¹ tsʰᴇ⁴⁴]), is a popular style of Chinese food. In a narrow sense, Shanghai cuisine refers only to what is traditionally called Benbang cuisine (pen⁵ paon¹ tshe⁵; 'local cuisine') which originated in Shanghai. In a broader sense, it refers to complex styles of cooking developed under the influence of neighboring Jiangsu and Zhejiang provinces. The dishes within the cuisine need to master the following three elements "color, aroma and taste" (Chinese: "色香味"). Like other cuisines within China, Shanghai cuisine emphasises the use of seasonings, the quality of raw ingredients, and preserving the original flavors of ingredients.  The adoption of Western influence in Shanghai cuisine resulted in a unique cooking style known as Haipai cuisine (海派菜).

Characteristic features
Shanghai cuisine is characterized by its use of soy sauce, which gives dishes a red and shiny appearance. Both dark soy sauce and regular soy sauce are used in Shanghai cooking. Dark soy sauce creates a dark amber color in dishes, while regular soy sauce enhances the flavor. The four classic words used to describe Shanghai food are "浓油赤酱," which means that Shanghai food uses a considerable amount of oil and soy sauce. Dishes are prepared using various methods, such as baking, stewing, braising, steaming, and deep-frying. Seafood is also a prominent feature of Shanghai cuisine, with fish, crab, and chicken being made "drunken" using spirits and brisk cooking techniques. Salted meats and preserved vegetables are commonly used to enhance various dishes. Additionally, sugar plays an important role in Shanghai cuisine when used in combination with soy sauce. Rice is more commonly served than noodles or other wheat products. 

Shanghai cuisine aims to emphasize the original flavors of raw ingredients while utilizing condiments to enhance taste. Compared to other Chinese cuisines, it has a mellower and slightly sweet taste. Sweet and sour is a typical Shanghai taste. Presentation is also a key aspect of Shanghai cuisine, with ingredients being meticulously cut and arranged to create a harmonious color scheme.

Interestingly, in the early 20th century, Shanghai families did not regularly include fish in their daily meals despite the city being a port town. Meat was considered a luxury, and meals typically consisted of vegetables, beans, and rice. Families would only consume meat or fish four times a month, on the second, eighth, sixteenth, and twenty-third days, which were known as dang hun. Today, with greater awareness of nutrition, there is a higher demand for low-sugar and low-fat foods, and more vegetables are being incorporated into diets to promote healthier eating habits.

History

Shanghai cuisine is the youngest of the ten major cuisines of China, although it still has more than 400 years of history. Traditionally called Benbang cuisine, it originated in the Ming and Qing dynasties (c. 1368-1840). During the reign of Emperor Jiaqing and Emperor Guangxu of the Qing Dynasty, a food stall was set up in the old city of Shanghai called "Shovel Bang"(铲刀帮). After 1930, as Shanghai's industry and commerce rapidly developed, the main customers of BenBang cuisine were an emerging class of workers. As a result, the proportion of inexpensive dishes in BenBang cuisine began to decrease.

In the later part of the 19th century, after Shanghai became a major domestic and international trading port, Benbang dishes underwent substantial change. After the opening of Shanghai port in 1843, sixteen different catering schools opened in Shanghai.  Anhui cuisine was the first to gain popularity in Shanghai, followed by Suxi cuisine, Cantonese cuisine, Huaiyang cuisine and Beijing cuisine. In the 1930s, Suxi cuisine was prevalent in almost half of Shanghai's restaurants. Guangdong cuisine was highly popular among both residents of Shanghai and foreigners. As a result of adopting influences from other cuisines, the flavors of Shanghai cuisine became more complex.

Western influence in Shanghai cuisine resulted in the development of a unique cooking style known as Haipai cuisine (海派菜). At the time, eating Western food was considered fashionable, but Chinese people initially struggled to adapt to certain aspects of Western cuisine, such as rare steak. Western food in Shanghai was influenced by many countries but formed its own distinct characteristics. Russian Shanghai Western food, which typically included one main dish and one soup (such as borscht, bread and butter), became particularly popular in Shanghai due to its economic benefits.  Before 1937, there were over 200 Western restaurants in Shanghai, particularly on Xiafei Road and Fuzhou Road.

Nowadays, Shanghai's traditional cuisine is usually found only in home-cooked meals and some old Benbang restaurants. Shanghai is now more famous for its numerous exotic restaurants, especially those serving Japanese and French food.

Notable dishes in Shanghai cuisine

Breakfast 
Breakfast food in Shanghai is varied and contains foods mainly made from wheat, rice and flour. Many of them are influenced by Cantonese cuisine, Jiangsu and Zhejiang cuisine, and through historical precipitation, these breakfasts have slowly become favorites of people in Shanghai today. The most classic Shanghai Breakfast is called "The Four Warriors" (sy⁵ du⁶ cin¹ kaon¹). These are the four most popular breakfast choices for Shanghainese.

 Glutinous rice rolls (tshy¹ ve⁶)
 Soy milk (deu⁶ cian¹)
 Chinese cruller (yeu⁶ diau⁶)
 Sesame pancake (du⁶ pin⁵)

Seafood
Seafood is commonly seen in Shanghai cuisine. These are some popular dishes.
 Eel noodles – (moe⁶ ng⁶ mi⁶) – Made with sliced eels and wheat noodles.
Scallion stewed crucian carp – (tshon¹ sau¹ ciq⁷ ng⁶) – The preparation of this common crucian carp dish is quite involved and complex. It requires a significant amount of time to prepare, as the fish must be soaked in vinegar, deep-fried, stewed for a prolonged period, and cooled to make it tender enough to be consumed with all its bones. The difficulty in perfecting this dish, as well as its complexity, led to it being used as a test by families when recruiting a cook.
 Shanghai hairy crab (zaon⁶ he⁵ mau⁶ ha⁵) – A variety of Chinese mitten crab. The crab is usually steamed with ginger, and eaten with a dipping sauce of rice vinegar, sugar and ginger. Mixing crab meat with lard to make Xiefen, and consuming it in xiaolongbao or with tofu, is another highlight of hairy crab season.
 Squirrel-shaped mandarin fish (son¹ tshy⁵ kue⁵ ng⁶) – This dish features fresh mandarin fish and combines sweet and sour flavors. The fish is deep-fried and has a crispy exterior and soft interior. The dish is yellow and red and it is displayed in the shape of a squirrel when plated. Hot broth is poured over it, which produces a high-pitched sound.

Meat and poultry

 Beggar's chicken (ciau⁵ ho⁵ ci¹ or ciau⁵ hua⁵ ci¹) – Beggar's Chicken calls for a chicken wrapped in lotus leaves, encased in mud, and roasted in fire, resulting in a delicious and tender meat. According to a legend, a beggar in the Qing dynasty stole and hid a chicken under mud which is where the name of the dish comes from.
 Lion's head (sy¹ tsy⁵ deu⁶) – The dish gets its name from the shape of the pork meatball resembling a lion's head and the cabbage, or other vegetables, resembling the lion's mane. It's served in two varieties: white or plain and red which is cooked with soy sauce, and is typically served in a white pot.
 Red braised pork belly (ghon⁶ sau¹ gnioq⁸) – The dish is a braised pork belly cooked in Shanghainese soy sauce for a long time, resulting in a juicy and tender meat.
 Sweet and sour spare ribs (daon⁶ tshu⁵ ba⁶ kueq⁷) – The fresh pork ribs, which appear shiny and red after being cooked, are traditionally deep fried then coated in a sweet and sour sauce.

Noodles 
 Shanghai fried noodles(zaon⁶ he⁵ tshau⁵ mi⁶) – Shanghai fried noodles are fried thick noodles (sometimes udon) with soy sauce. It is most commonly cooked with bok choy and pork.
 Chilled noodles(lan⁶ mi⁶) – This dish is a combination of chilled noodles mixed with various sauces and toppings. Traditionally, the noodles are steamed before being cooked for improved flavor. After the noodles are cooled, they are mixed with sesame oil, soy sauce, and peanut sauce.  People often add additional toppings when making it at home, and commonly use leftover food they have in the fridge.
 Noodle soup(thaon¹ mi⁶) – Su-style noodles are a common type of noodle soup that many people in Shanghai eat daily. This type of noodle soup offers a choice of two different soup bases, and it's typically garnished with various toppings, mostly meat.

Soup 

 Borscht (lu⁶ son⁵ thaon¹) – This dish is a combination of tomatoes and beef. It is considered a classic Shanghai dish that incorporates local elements of Shanghai cuisine. The sweet and sour flavor of the dish is particularly popular among Shanghainese. Originally introduced to Shanghai from Russia, it has now become a common dish in Shanghai homes.

Snacks 
 Shengjian mantou (san¹ ci¹ moe⁶ deu⁶) or Shengjianbao (san¹ ci¹ pau¹) – Shanghai mantou is a round bun filled with pork, similar to a xiaolongbao but thicker due to the addition of yeast. It is pan-fried and topped with sesame seeds and chopped scallions for flavor.
The delicious soup stays inside the dumpling until it is bitten.
Guotie (ku¹ thiq⁷) or potstickers – Essentially a Jiaozi, but rather than being boiled or steamed, they are fried in a pan with oil on one side and then water is added to the pan and covered to steam the rest of the dumpling. Traditionally, Guotie are filled with ground pork and finely chopped Chinese scallions or cabbage.
Savory mooncakes (shi¹ gnioq⁸ yuq⁸ pin⁵) –  Mooncakes consumed in other part of China are usually sweet, with fillings such as sesame seeds, walnuts, and red bean paste. However, in Shanghai, during the Mid-Autumn Festival, locals consume a savory version of mooncakes filled with meat.  This type of mooncake is usually only available at select local restaurants.

Desserts 

 Tangyuan (thaon¹ yoe⁶) – A type of sweet dumpling made of glutinous rice flour and stuffed with black sesame. Qibao has a number of tangyuan vendors.

See also
 Chinese cuisine
 Haipai cuisine
Jiangsu cuisine
 List of Chinese dishes

References

External links

china.org.cn Top 10 most famous Shanghai snacks September 12, 2011